The Iranun are a Moro ethnic group native to Mindanao, Philippines (in Maguindanao del Norte: Barira, Buldon, Parang, Matanog, Sultan Mastura, and Sultan Kudarat; North Cotabato: Alamada, Banisilan, Carmen, Libungan, and Pigcawayan; Lanao del Norte: Kauswagan and Kolambugan; Lanao del Sur: Balabagan, Bumbaran, and Picong; Bukidnon: Kalilangan; Zamboanga del Sur: Pagadian City, San Pablo, Dumalinao, Dimataling and Tukuran)
(the west coast of Sabah, Malaysia (in which they are found in 25 villages around the Kota Belud and Lahad Datu districts; also in Kudat and Likas, Kota Kinabalu, in which they assimilate with their fellow Sama-Bajau counterparts owing to their shared ethnolinguistic roots being of Moro stock), There are Iranun communities in Indonesia especially Riau Islands, Sumatra, Kalimantan who adopted the Melayu Timur identity and language but still used the Iranun at the same time.

Origins

The origin of the name "Iranun" remains contested. The "Iranun" (archaic "Iranaoan") may have been the original endonym of the ancestral group which later split into the Iranun, Maranao, and Maguindanao people. The Iranun and Maranao still speak the language closest to the ancient Proto-Danaw among all of the Danao languages spoken by these groups.

History

For centuries, the Iranun were involved in pirate-related occupations in Southeast Asia. Originally from the Sultanate of Maguindanao, in southern Mindanao, Iranun colonies spread throughout Mindanao, the Sulu Archipelago and the north and east coast of Borneo. Most Iranuns are Muslim. Their language is part of the Austronesian family, and is most closely related to the language of the Maranao people of Lanao. Historically, the Iranun were given the exonym Ilanun (also spelled variously as Illanun, Illanoan, Illanoon, Ilanoon, etc.) during the British colonial era. The Malay term Lanun (which came to mean "pirate") originated from the exonym.

In the case of inter-marriages of an Iranun woman and an outsider man, the cultural influences of the woman's family will be more dominant that the outsider man would be considered as an Iranun man; although in a lot cases this does not happen.

The Sultanate of Maguindanao traces its ancestry to Iranun roots. For several centuries, the Iranuns in the Philippines formed part of the Sultanate of Maguindanao. In the past, the seat of the Maguindanao Sultanate was situated at Lamitan and Malabang. Both of which were the strongholds of the Iranun society. Iranuns fought the Western invaders under the flag of the Maguindanao Sultanate. They formed part of the Moro resistance against the USA occupation of the Philippines from 1899 to 1913. The Iranun were excellent in maritime activity as they are traditionally sailors and pirates. They used to ply the route connecting the Sulu Sea, Moro Gulf to Celebes Sea, and raided the Spanish held territories along the way.

See also
 Sama-Bajau people
 Karakoa
 Garay (ship)
 Penjajap

References

Ethnic groups in Sabah
Ethnic groups in Mindanao
Muslim communities of the Philippines
Moro ethnic groups